Lezmond Charles Mitchell (September 17, 1981 – August 26, 2020) was a Native-American criminal who was executed by the United States federal government for the 2001 murders of a woman and her granddaughter in Arizona. The murders were committed during the course of a carjacking, and since this is qualified as a federal offense, Mitchell was tried and convicted in federal court. His case sparked controversy as the Navajo Nation tribe he was a part of openly opposed the government's plans for his execution, along with Mitchell himself maintaining he was involved in the murders but was not the mastermind behind them. Mitchell was the only Native-American on federal death row up until his execution via lethal injection on August 26, 2020.

Early life 
Lezmond Charles Mitchell was born in Fort Defiance, Arizona on September 17, 1981. Born 1/4 Navajo, 1/4 White, and 1/2 Marshallese, Mitchell was of Native-American heritage. He and his family were a part of the Navajo Nation tribe. 

Mitchell was raised by his grandparents George and Bobbi Jo who were allegedly abusive. In his early years, his grandparents beat him with a variety of objects; a ruler, broom handles, and appliance parts to be exact. As a result of the beatings Mitchell developed depression, cognitive disorder, and antisocial personality disorder. This also led to him struggling with his weight and his Native-American heritage, as he believed that he was not a "true Navajo." In his 6th grade year, Mitchell was moved to California to live with his mother. Upon living with her, she began inflicting control on to him; she contacted students at the school to report any of Mitchell's behavior to her and required Mitchell to check in with her every 30 minutes. She also made fun of weight and often ranted about wasting money on food for him. 

The emotional abuse Mitchell received from this led him to start drinking and doing drugs, which eventually led to addiction. He also ran away from home once. At 14 years old Mitchell had his first run in with the law after he vandalized a bathroom wall. He graduated high school as an honors student in 2000.

Murders 
In 2001, Mitchell crossed paths with 16-year-old Johnny Theodore Orsinger, a teenager who had been involved in the carjacking and double murder of 47-year-old David Begay and 30-year-old Jasbert Sam on August 28. In October, the two made their own plans for a carjacking and murder. On October 28, 2001, Mitchell and Orsinger were hitchhiking when they were picked up by 65-year-old Alyce Slim and her 9-year-old granddaughter Tiffany Lee. Slim and Lee were returning home after a visit to two women in Gallup. Slim drove Mitchell and Orsinger to their requested location, but when there both attacked her and Lee; The duo produced a knife and stabbed both multiple times, with Mitchell slitting Lee's throat, bludgeoning Slim with rocks and stabbing her to death. Afterwards, when both were dead, they dragged both their bodies into the nearby woods, decapitated their bodies and lit them on fire. Both then buried their remains in a shallow grave. They then carjacked their vehicle and kept it in their possession. On October 31, three days after the murders, three armed men robbed the Red Rock Trading Post Office while wearing Halloween masks, and used Slim's vehicle as a getaway car. They ended up abandoning the car on November 1 and attempted to light it on fire.

Legal proceedings 
As a result of a large investigation, on November 4 and 5, 2001, the Navajo Nation Strategic Reaction Team surrounded the Round Rock residents of Mitchell, Orsinger, 34-year-old Teddy Orsinger, 20-year-old George Nakai, 23-year-old Jimmy Nakai Jr., Danny Leal, and Jason Kinlicheenie on suspicion of being involved in the murders, with most of them being present at the Begay and Sam murders. They were captured, and in November, a federal grand jury indicted Mitchell on 11 counts, including kidnapping, carjacking, robbery and murder. 

Since he was being tried federally, prosecutors sought a death sentence. The Navajo Department of Justice openly opposed the prosecutors plans to seek the death penalty in a statement in 2002. Orsinger, since he was juvenile, was ordered to be tried separately. The Orsingers, the Nakais, Leal, and Kinlicheenie were all convicted for their roles in the Begay and Sam murders and sentenced to life in prison. Mitchell's trial began in April 2003 and lasted a month. Mitchell's lawyers maintained that, while their client was present at the time of the killings, he was not the one that perpetrated them, but instead Orsinger was the actual mastermind behind it. On May 8, Mitchell was convicted on all counts and sentenced to death. Orsinger was convicted later in December for his role in the Slim and Lee murders and given another life sentence.

In 2015, Mitchell argued his case to a three-judge panel. He claimed that his original defense team was ineffective, though the U.S. Court of Appeals for the Ninth Circuit counter-argued that Mitchell's defense had been "thorough in the extreme" and upheld his sentence. During the presidency of Donald Trump, Mitchell was one of several condemned men on federal death row selected to be executed. He was first scheduled to be executed on December 11, 2019, and would have been the first person executed by the federal government since the execution of Louis Jones Jr. in 2003. Mitchell's attorneys in the meantime sought a stay of execution to investigate possible racial bias by the jury who convicted him. 

Shortly before the scheduled execution, the U.S. Court of Appeals granted the stay while it resolved an additional appeal. In May 2020 a federal court in Arizona denied Mitchell an opportunity to interview former jurors, and the decision was upheld by the U.S. Court of Appeals.

Execution 

In July 2020 U.S. attorney general William Barr scheduled Mitchell's execution to occur on August 26. During this time, executions by the federal government started up again, and three inmates were executed that month, with Mitchell scheduled to be the fourth. In early August Mitchell's attorneys sought a delay of execution and argued that it should be performed in Arizona rather than be conducted by the federal government. Judge David Campbell rejected the proposal. 

On the day of his execution, numerous protesters stood outside the Federal Correction Complex to protest Mitchell's execution. Mitchell was brought into the execution room in USP Terre Haute at 6:03 pm, where he was strapped to a gurney and injected with a fatal dose of pentobarbital. When asked if he would like to make a final statement he replied "No, I'm good". At 6:29 p.m. he went unresponsive and was declared dead, with the execution officially concluding. Up until his death, Mitchell was the only Native American on federal death row. His body was subsequently cremated and his ashes were given to Navajo Nation tribal members.

Controversies 
The execution was controversial, as the Navajo Nation tribe he was a part of openly opposed of having Mitchell executed. Mitchell's attorneys attacked the U.S. government's decision to execute him in a public statement and accused them of injustice against Native Americans; 

"Mr. Mitchell's execution represents a gross insult to the sovereignty of Navajo Nation, whose leaders had personally called on the President to commute his sentence to life without the possibility of release. The very fact that he faced execution despite the tribe's opposition to a death sentence for him reflected the government's disdain to tribal sovereignty".  

They also brought up that, under federal law, Native American tribes can decide whether they want their citizens subjected to the death penalty and Navajo Nation opposed the death penalty; however, since Mitchell was convicted under federal law of carjacking (which is a federal crime no matter who committed it), this made the tribe unable to interfere. The family of Slim and Lee supported the execution and stated it brought them closure. Lee's father, Daniel, said that no matter how much Navajo Nation objects, they do not represent him:

"He took my daughter away, and no remorse or anything like that. The Navajo Nation president, the council, they don’t speak for me. I speak for myself and for my daughter."

Johnny Orsinger is currently imprisoned at USP Victorville in California.

See also 
 Capital punishment by the United States federal government
 List of people executed by the United States federal government
 List of people executed in the United States in 2020

References 

1981 births
2020 deaths
2001 murders in the United States
21st-century American criminals
21st-century executions by the United States federal government
21st-century executions of American people
American people executed for murder
Criminals from Arizona
People convicted of murder by the United States federal government
People convicted under the Federal Kidnapping Act
People executed by the United States federal government by lethal injection
People from Fort Defiance, Arizona
Violence against women in the United States